Tylexocladus is a genus of deep-water sea sponge belonging to the family Polymastiidae. These are small rounded sponges with a bristly surface bearing one or more raised openings (known as "osculae").

Species
Species include:
Tylexocladus hispidus
Tylexocladus joubini

References

Polymastiidae